The Quebradillas Limestone is a geologic formation in Puerto Rico. It preserves fossils dating back to the Neogene period.

See also

 List of fossiliferous stratigraphic units in Puerto Rico
 Quebradillas, Puerto Rico

References

External links 
 

Geologic formations of Puerto Rico
Geologic formations of the Caribbean
Neogene Puerto Rico
Limestone formations of the United States
Limestone formations